Nabis was the last king of independent Sparta. He was probably a member of the Heracleidae, and he ruled from 207 BC to 192 BC, during the years of the First and Second Macedonian Wars and the eponymous "War against Nabis", i.e. against him. After taking the throne by executing two claimants, he began rebuilding Sparta's power. During the Second Macedonian War, Nabis sided with King Philip V of Macedon and in return he received the city of Argos. However, when the war began to turn against the Macedonians, he defected to Rome. After the war, the Romans, urged by the Achaean League, attacked Nabis and defeated him. He then was assassinated in 192 BC by the Aetolian League. He represented the last phase of Sparta's reformist period.

Ruler of Sparta
In the years following the defeat of the reformist king Cleomenes III of Sparta at the Battle of Sellasia (222 BC), Sparta experienced a power vacuum that eventually led to the Spartan kingship being bestowed on a child, Pelops, for whom first Machanidas (d. 207 BC) and then Nabis acted as regents. Nabis, however, soon overthrew Pelops, claiming to be a descendant of the Eurypontid king Demaratus. Although Nabis styled himself as king and is called basileus on his coins, Livy and Polybius refer to him as a tyrant.

Nabis was committed to the reformist program of Cleomenes III and took it to extreme lengths, exiling the wealthy and dividing up their estates.  He freed many slaves and made them citizens, but left the institution of helotry in place as part of the Lycurgan system which he was claiming to restore.  The increased citizen body, however, meant that Nabis had more citizen troops for his army, which also included numerous mercenaries.  Polybius, who was deeply hostile to Nabis' revolutionary program, described his supporters as "a crowd of murderers, burglars, cutpurses and highwaymen" (ἀνδροφόνοι καὶ παρασχίσται, λωποδύται, τοιχωρύχοι).

Nabis executed the last descendants of the two Spartan royal dynasties; and the ancient sources, especially Polybius and Livy, depict him as a bloodthirsty ruler who held power through armed force and shocking brutality. Polybius (13.6-7) claims that he would frequently exile the leading citizens of conquered communities and marry their wives to the brigands and freed slaves under his command. Polybius, (13.6) in an account that either demonstrates the extent of the tyranny of Nabis or the bias of Polybius, tells how wealthy landowners often were summoned into his presence and forced to pay him large sums of money, those who refused were tortured supposedly through use of a machine that resembled an Iron maiden, known as the Apega of Nabis, made after the form of his own wife, Queen Apega.

Foreign policy
In foreign policy, Nabis pursued much the same policy as his predecessors: opposing the Achaean League and Macedonia by allying himself with the Aetolians, Elis, and Messene. This led him into an alliance with Rome during the First Macedonian War, signing a peace treaty with Rome in 205 at the Peace of Phoenice.

In the following years Nabis expanded Spartan power, reconquering  much of Laconia and Messene.  In 204 BC, he opened raids on Megalopolis, which did not break out into war until 202.  He also re-established a fleet (apparently with the help of Cretan allies, whom Polybius describes as "pirates"), and used it to re-establish control of the Laconian coastline.  He also fortified the city of Sparta for the first time. (Previously, the Spartans had viewed their city's defence as depending on the bravery of their hoplites.)

In 201 BC, he invaded the territory of Messene, which had been an ally of Sparta in the previous decades, apparently an attempt to re-establish the control which Sparta had had over the region until the mid 4th century BC.  Messene fell to Nabis, but the Spartans were  forced to retreat when the army of Philopoemen intervened. Nabis' forces were decisively defeated at Tegea and he was forced to check his expansionist ambitions for the time.

Nabis' territorial ambitions brought him into conflict with the Achaean League, which controlled the northern half of the Peloponnese. Although repeatedly defeated by the gifted Achaean strategos Philopoemen, he nevertheless remained a serious threat to the Achaeans, who were considerably less successful against him when led by less competent generals. In 200 BC, alarmed at the ease with which he was ravaging their territory, the Achaeans asked the Macedonian King Philip V for help, which he did not provide. In the following years, Nabis was able to skilfully exploit the conflict between Philip and the Romans, gaining control of the important city of Argos as the price of his alliance with the Macedonians, and then defecting to the soon to be victorious Romans so that he might hold on to his conquest.

War with Rome
In 195 BC, however, the Roman Proconsul Titus Quinctius Flamininus was persuaded by the Achaeans that the power of Nabis in the Peloponnese needed to be checked. Flamininus ordered Nabis to give Argos back to the Achaeans, or face war with Rome. When Nabis refused, citing the Roman acceptance of his friendship at a time when he had  already been in possession of the city as justification, Flamininus invaded Laconia. After an inconclusive campaign the Spartans were defeated, and Nabis was forced to surrender both Argos and the port of Gytheum, which gave him access to the sea.

Recovery and death

Though the territory under his control now consisted only of the city of Sparta and its immediate environs, Nabis still hoped to regain his former power. In 192 BC, seeing that the Romans and their Achaean allies were distracted by the imminent war with King Antiochus III of the Seleucid Empire and the Aetolian League, Nabis attempted to recapture Gytheum and the Laconian coastline. Initially, he was successful, capturing the port and defeating the Achaean League in a minor naval battle.

Soon after, however, his army was routed by Philopoemen and shut up within the walls of Sparta. After ravaging the surrounding countryside Philopoemen returned home. Within a few months Nabis appealed to the Aetolian League to send troops so that he might protect his territory against the Romans and the Achaean League.

The Aetolians responded by sending an army of 1,000 infantry and 300 cavalry to Sparta. Once there, however, the Aetolians betrayed the tyrant – assassinating him while he was drilling his army outside the city. The Aetolians then attempted to take control of the city but were prevented from doing so by an uprising of the citizens.

The Achaeans, seeking to take advantage of the ensuing chaos, dispatched Philopoemen to Sparta with a large army. Once there he compelled the Spartans to join the Achaean League. Nabis had thus been the last leader of an independent Sparta, and the last ruler under whom the Spartans had been a major power in Greece.

Citations

Sources

Primary sources

Titus Livius (Livy), The History of Rome, trans Rev. Canon Roberts. London J. M. Dent & Sons, Ltd, 1905.
Polybius, translated by Frank W. Walbank, (1979). The Rise of the Roman Empire. New York: Penguin Classics. .

Secondary sources 
Paul Cartledge and Antony Spawforth, (2002). Hellenistic and Roman Sparta: A tale of two cities. London: Routledge. 
Maurice Holleaux, (1930). Cambridge Ancient History: Rome and the Mediterranean; 218-133 B.C., (1st edition) Vol VIII. Los Angeles: Cambridge University Press.
Jones, A.H.M. (1967). Sparta. Oxford: Basil Blackwell.
William Smith, (1873). Dictionary of Greek and Roman Biography and Mythology. London: John Murray.

3rd-century BC births
192 BC deaths
3rd-century BC monarchs
2nd-century BC monarchs
2nd-century BC murdered monarchs
3rd-century BC Spartans
2nd-century BC Spartans
Rulers of Sparta
Second Macedonian War
Year of birth unknown
Eurypontid kings of Sparta
Regents